Otto Nagel (23 February 1889 – 2 September 1947) was a Danish wrestler. He competed in the light heavyweight event at the 1912 Summer Olympics.

References

External links
 

1889 births
1947 deaths
Olympic wrestlers of Denmark
Wrestlers at the 1912 Summer Olympics
Danish male sport wrestlers
Sportspeople from Copenhagen